The Pepsi Senior Challenge was a golf tournament on the Champions Tour from 1986 to 1988. It was played in Roswell, Georgia at the Horseshoe Bend Country Club.

The purse for the 1988 tournament was US$300,000, with $45,000 going to the winner.

Winners
1988 Bob Charles
1987 Larry Mowry
1986 Bruce Crampton

Source:

References

Former PGA Tour Champions events
Golf in Georgia (U.S. state)